Ng Leung-sing is a former member of the Provisional Legislative Council and Legislative Council of Hong Kong for the Election Committee constituency and the Finance functional constituency from 1997 to 2004 and 2012 to 2016. He was also the Vice-chairman of the China & South Sea Bank Limited. He supported Leung Chun-ying in the 2012 Chief Executive race and is seen as an ally of CY Leung in the Legislative Council.

Controversies
During the 2015 Hong Kong heavy metal in drinking water incidents, he became known for asking Carrie Lam whether there were any health benefits to consuming water "with an appropriate level of lead."

At 5 January 2016, he commented on the missing Causeway Bay bookseller incident, alleging that the missing booksellers were arrested for illegally entering the mainland to patronise prostitutes without any evidence. His comment was later reprimanded by the wife of one of the missing booksellers, Lee Bo, who stated that she retained her right to sue for libel.

References

External links
 Member of the Legislative Council – Hon NG Leung-sing

Living people
1949 births
Delegates to the 10th National People's Congress from Hong Kong
Delegates to the 11th National People's Congress from Hong Kong
Delegates to the 12th National People's Congress from Hong Kong
Delegates to the 13th National People's Congress from Hong Kong
Members of the Selection Committee of Hong Kong
Members of the Provisional Legislative Council
HK LegCo Members 1998–2000
HK LegCo Members 2000–2004
HK LegCo Members 2012–2016
University of Macau alumni
Recipients of the Silver Bauhinia Star